Clifton Ko (born 6 August, 1958) is a Hong Kong film director, actor, producer and scriptwriter.

Background
Clifton Ko graduated from Kwun Tong Maryknoll College, and entered TV and film industry in late 1970s, firstly worked with director Clifford Choi. In this period he wrote Choi's No U-Turn (1981) and Teenage Dreamers, and John Woo's comedy Once a Thief. In 1982 Ko entered Raymond Wong's the newly founded Cinema City & Films Co., and directed his first film The Happy Ghost in 1984. The film series, like all his major works, is a slapstick comedy with moral teaching, family value, and optimism. Ko, together with the company, is prolific in making "Chinese New Year movies". Important titles include family comedy series It's a Mad, Mad, Mad World (beginning in 1987); Chicken and Duck Talk, a collaboration with comedian/writer Michael Hui; and ensemble comedy series All's Well, Ends Well (beginning in 1992); and It's a Wonderful Life (1994) (Stokes).

During the 2019 Anti-Extradition Law Amendment Bill protests and the subsequent 2020 imposition by the Chinese Communist Party of the Hong Kong national security law, Ko supported the police to defend Hong Kong against riots and to oppose Western interference .

Filmography as director

Other work 
Ko is a vocal supporter of the Pro-Beijing Camp in Hong Kong.

References

 Lisa Odham Stokes. Historical Dictionary of Hong Kong Cinema. Scarecrow Press. 2007. Print. . 204–205.

External links
 
 HK cinemagic entry

Hong Kong film directors
Hong Kong screenwriters
1958 births
Living people
Members of the Election Committee of Hong Kong, 2007–2012
Members of the Election Committee of Hong Kong, 2012–2017
Members of the Election Committee of Hong Kong, 2017–2021
Members of the Election Committee of Hong Kong, 2021–2026
Chinese film directors